The 1973 Queen's Club Championships was a tennis tournament played on grass courts at the Queen's Club in London in the United Kingdom. The men's tournament was part of the 1973 Commercial Union Assurance Grand Prix circuit while the women's event was part of the 1973 Women's Grand Prix tour. It was the 74th edition of the tournament and was held from 17 June until 23 June 1973. Ilie Năstase and Olga Morozova won the singles titles.

Finals

Men's singles

 Ilie Năstase defeated  Roger Taylor 9–8, 6–3
 It was Năstase's 10th singles title of the year and the 34th of his career.

Women's singles
 Olga Morozova defeated  Evonne Goolagong 6–2, 6–3
 It was Morozova's 2nd title of the year and the 7th of her career.

Men's doubles

 Tom Okker /  Marty Riessen defeated  Ray Keldie /  Raymond Moore 6–4, 7–5
 It was Okker's 10th title of the year and the 43rd of his career. It was Riessen's 5th title of the year and the 35th of his career.

Women's doubles
 Rosie Casals /  Billie Jean King defeated  Françoise Dürr /  Betty Stöve 4–6, 6–3, 7–5
 It was Casals' 2nd title of the year and the 20th of her career. It was King's 1st title of the year and the 47th of her career.

References

External links
 ITF tournament edition details
 ATP tournament profile

 
Queen's Club Championships
Queen's Club Championships
Queen's Club Championships
Queen's Club Championships
Queen's Club Championships